Herman Charles Merivale MA (27 January 1839 – 17 August 1906)  was an English dramatist and poet, son of Herman Merivale.  He also used the punning pseudonym Felix Dale.

Life 
Herman Charles Merivale was born in London on 27 January 1839, the only son of Herman Merivale (1806–1874), a barrister and civil servant who was permanent under-secretary of the India Office, and his wife, Caroline Penelope  Robinson (d. 1881), daughter of the Revd William Villiers Robinson. Merivale was educated at Harrow School and Balliol College, Oxford, where Algernon Charles Swinburne and Charles Bowen were his contemporaries. He graduated BA in 1861. At his father's home he met many distinguished men, including Lord Robert Cecil (afterwards Prime Minister Lord Salisbury), who became a lifelong friend. His friends in literary and dramatic circles included William Makepeace Thackeray, Edward Bulwer-Lytton, Matthew Arnold, Anthony Trollope, W. S. Gilbert, Arthur Sullivan, Edmund Yates, Charles Dickens and others.
 
Following his father's death in 1874 he gave up the law in favour of literature and the theatre. Merivale wrote many farces and burlesques. For John Hollingshead he produced a burlesque, The Lady of Lyons Married and Settled, performed at the Gaiety Theatre (1878), and Called There and Back (1884). The Butler (1886) and The Don (1888) were both written for the actor J. L. Toole. In writing The Don, and other works, Merivale was assisted by his wife, Elizabeth, the daughter of John Pittman, whom he married in London on 13 May 1878.

During the 1870s, he was a resident of Ticehurst House Hospital after suffering depression for many years following a breakdown. He wrote of his experiences there in a book called My Experiences in a Lunatic Asylum by a Sane Patient. In 1879 he went to Australia on the advice of his physician, and then returned with his health recovered, only to discover that the power of attorney he had left with a defaulting solicitor had cost him his entire fortune.

A few years before his death Merivale became a Roman Catholic. He died suddenly of heart failure on 14 January 1906 at 69 Woodstock Road, Acton, Middlesex, and was buried in his father's grave in Brompton Cemetery. He had no children and his widow was granted a civil-list pension of £50 in 1906.

Works
A Husband in Clover (1873), farce
All For Her (1875), drama
Forget Me Not (1879), drama (with Florence Crauford Grove)
My Experience in a Lunatic Asylum, by a Sane Patient. London: Chatto and Windus (1879)
Faucit Of Balliol (1882), novel
The White Pilgrim (1883), drama 
Binko's Blues (1884)
Florien (1884), drama
The Butler (1886), drama 
The Don (1888)
A Life of Thackeray (1891) biography, with Frank T. Marzials
The Lady of Lyons Married and Settled, Victorian burlesque of The Lady of Lyons
Peacock's Holiday, farce
A Son of the Soil, drama
Bar, Stage and Platform, autobiographical memories (1902)

References

External links
 
 
 

1839 births
1906 deaths
People educated at Harrow School
People associated with Gilbert and Sullivan
Alumni of Balliol College, Oxford
Burials at Brompton Cemetery
English male dramatists and playwrights
English male poets
19th-century English poets
19th-century English dramatists and playwrights
19th-century British male writers